Arise! is the second album by the British crust punk band Amebix. It was released on 14 September 1985 by Alternative Tentacles and reissued on CD and vinyl in 2000 with two bonus tracks recorded in 1987. The album was remastered a second time in 2014.

"The Moor" is based upon "Requiem" by György Ligeti, famously used in the Lunar monolith sequence in 2001: A Space Odyssey.

"Largactyl" is a misspelled version of the proprietary name the antipsychotic medication chlorpromazine. It was written in response to (and somewhat in honour of) previous drummer Martin Baker being diagnosed with paranoid schizophrenia and being involuntarily institutionalised by his parents.

Lyrics from "The Darkest Hour" are taken from And When I Die by Laura Nyro.

Track listing

Critical reception

Reviews of the album, and its re-masterings, were positive across reviews.

AllMusic praised its successful merging of genres, combined with "tribal rhythms and apocalyptic aesthetic" with bleak yet hopeful lyrics. They also noted its major role in inspiring later metal bands such as Sepultura and Neurosis.

Punknews was extremely positive, describing the original as a major advancement on both the band's prior efforts but also that of other similar bands. Again the ability to blend genres with both power and darkness remarked on, counterbalanced by moments of lyrical hope. The 2014 remastering was also appreciated, with certain intricacies given greater sharpness and notability, further improving the complexity of the album.

Quietus also felt Arise! trod new ground, with yet more mention of its metal/punk genre combo, and added Gallhammer to the bands inspired by it.

Personnel
Amebix
 The Baron Rockin von Aphid (Rob Miller) – bass, vocals
 Stig da Pig (Chris Miller) – guitar, backing vocals
 George Fletcher – keyboard
 Spider (Robert Richards) – drums

Guest musicians
 Gabba Cox, Mark Byrne – backing vocals

Additional personnel
 Jason Rosenberg – production, design, concept
 George Horn – remastering (2000 re-release)

References

External links
 Artist Direct Album Profile accessed 3 March 2008
 Buy.com Album Profile accessed 3 March 2008
 Amebix.net Official Discography accessed 1 March 2011

1985 albums
Amebix albums
Alternative Tentacles albums